"Down the Road" is a song by the French electronic music band C2C that was released on 25 June 2012 on the On And On. Taken from the same-titled EP Down the Road (2012), the song was written by Sylvain Richard, Guillaume Jaulin, Thomas Le Vexier, Pierre Forestier and Arnaud Fradin. The single reached the top of the SNEP chart, the official French Singles Chart. It was also a hit in Belgium and the Netherlands. The single also appears on the band debut album Tetra also released in 2012.

C2C  sampled the vocals from Eddie Cusic's, “You Don't Have to Go” for "Down the Road".

Music video
The music video features New Zealand pro skateboarder Richie Jackson.

Charts

Weekly charts

Year-end charts

References

2012 singles
English-language French songs
SNEP Top Singles number-one singles
2012 songs
Mercury Records singles